Rocío Carrasco Mohedano (born 29 April 1977) is a Spanish media personality, television host, model, businesswoman, producer and actress. Carrasco first gained media attention as a daughter of the Spanish world champion boxer Pedro Carrasco and singer Rocío Jurado. In 2021 she starred in her own docu-series in Telecinco entitled Rocío, contar la verdad para seguir viva where she talks about her life.

References

External links
 

1977 births
Living people
Spanish actresses
Spanish television actresses
21st-century Spanish singers
21st-century Spanish women singers